Michael Brentan (born 16 April 2002) is an Italian professional footballer who plays as a midfielder for  club AlbinoLeffe.

Club career
Born in Piove di Sacco, Brentan finish his youth career in Juventus and Sampdoria.

Sampdoria
In 2021, he signed for Sampdoria.

On 21 July 2021, he joined Serie C club Pro Sesto on loan. He made his professional debut on 29 August 2021 against Giana Erminio.

On 18 August 2022, Brentan signed with AlbinoLeffe.

International career
Brentan was a young international for Italy. He was named in the 2019 FIFA U-17 World Cup final squad.

References

External links
 
 

2002 births
Living people
Sportspeople from the Province of Padua
Footballers from Veneto
Italian footballers
Association football midfielders
Serie C players
U.C. Sampdoria players
Pro Sesto 2013 players
U.C. AlbinoLeffe players
Italy youth international footballers